BT-Epoxy (where BT stands for bismaleimide triazine, its chemical components) is one of a number of thermoset resins used in printed circuit boards (PCBs). It is a mixture of epoxy resin, a common raw material for PCBs and BT resins. BT stands for Bismaleimide-Triazine resin. This is in turn a mixture of bismaleimide, which is also used as a raw material for PCBs and cyanate ester. Three cyano groups of the cyanate ester are trimerized to a triazine ring structure, hence the T in the name. In presence of a bismaleimide, the double bond of the maleimide group can copolymerize with the cyano groups to heterocyclic 6-membered aromatic ring structures with two nitrogen atoms (pyrimidines). The cure reaction occurs at temperatures up to 250 degrees C, and is catalyzed by strongly basic molecules like Dabco (diazabicyclooctane) and 4-DMAP (4-dimethylaminopyridin). Products with very high glass transition temperatures (Tg)- up to 300 degrees C -  and very low dielectric constant can be obtained. These properties make these materials very attractive for use in PCBs, which are often subjected to such conditions.

Applications of Epoxy 
Epoxy resin coatings have long been used in marine, construction, and industrial environments for the high level of protection they provide as a final coating. They have increasingly been used by craftspeople and artists according to the Chicago Tribune (citation ?). Epoxy flooring is valued in warehouses, and in the food industry. It is versatile and comes in a variety of colors. 
Synthetic resins

References